Pethor or Petor is identified in the Hebrew Bible as the home of the prophet (or diviner) Balaam, near to the Euphrates River (literally, the River).

According to the Book of Numbers, Balak, the king of Moab, sent messengers to Pethor to meet with Balaam in order to elicit a curse upon the Israelite people who had left Egypt and were approaching Moab to occupy the land. Balaam required the messengers to stay overnight in Pethor and to await his response until the next morning. In Deuteronomy, Baalam is described as "Balaam the son of Beor from Pethor of Mesopotamia" (literally, Aram Naharaim).

Earlier research speculated that it was the same place as Pitru, a town mentioned in ancient Assyrian records.

More recently, Pethor has been identified by Shea with the modern Deir Alla, due to the Deir Alla Inscription, which mentions Pethor and Balaam son of Beor. Since Deir Alla is located just east of the Jordan River rather than close to the Euphrates River, Shea speculates that the reference in Numbers 22:5 to "the River", a phrase later used in the Hebrew Bible for the Euphrates River, might have been used to refer to the Jordan River, and that the reference to Aram in Deuteronomy 23:4 is actually a scribal error for Adam, with Naharaim being a later scribal addition.

References 

Hebrew Bible places